Ctenochaetus tominiensis, known commonly as the Tomini surgeonfish among other vernacular names, is a species of marine fish in the family Acanthuridae.

The Tomini surgeonfish is widespread throughout the tropical waters of the central Indo-Pacific region from Indonesia to the Tonga Islands.

The Tomini surgeonfish is a small size fish and can reach a maximum size of 16 cm length.

It occasionally makes its way into the aquarium trade.

References

External links
 Ctenochaetus tominiensis care sheet at FishGeeks
http://www.marinespecies.org/aphia.php?p=taxdetails&id=277562
 

Acanthuridae
Fish described in 1955